This list of fictional big cats in animation is subsidiary to the list of fictional animals and is a collection of various notable feline characters that appear in various animated works of fiction. It is limited to well-referenced examples of large felines portrayed in animated television shows or feature-length films.

Cheetahs

Leopards

Lions

Tigers

Other

References

Animation Big
Big Cats